The Devil's Whore (released as The Devil's Mistress in North America) is a four-part television series set during the English Civil War, produced by Company Pictures for Channel 4 in 2008. It is about the adventures of the fictional Angelica Fanshawe and the historical Leveller soldier Edward Sexby and spans the years 1636 to 1660. It was written by Peter Flannery, who began working on the script in 1997. It is believed to have had a budget of £7 million. It was followed by a sequel series, New Worlds, in 2014.

Production

The series was filmed in South Africa. This caused some negative comment from reviewers but the producers maintained that they had been unable to find suitably "old English" locations in England.

Cast

 John Simm as Edward Sexby
 Dominic West as Oliver Cromwell
 Andrea Riseborough as Angelica Fanshawe
 Michael Fassbender as Thomas Rainsborough
 Peter Capaldi as King Charles I
 Jeremy Crutchley as Toop
 Tom Goodman-Hill as John Lilburne
 Maxine Peake as Elizabeth Lilburne, John's wife
 Tim McInnerny as Joliffe
 Robyn Olivia as Angelica's mother
 Robert Coleman as Angelica's father
 Ben Aldridge as Harry Fanshawe
 Harry Lloyd as Prince Rupert
 Melodie Abad as Queen Henrietta Maria
 Ian Redford as Earl of Manchester
 Angelica Jopling as the young Angelica
 Gabriel Rybko as young Harry
 Robert van Vuuren as The Devil

Episodes

North American release

The series was released on DVD in North America in 2011. Retitled The Devil's Mistress, it presents the series as two two-hour episodes.

Reception
Critical reception was positive, though there was some criticism of the omission of some figures and events (such as John Pym, the Earl of Bedford, Sir Thomas Fairfax, Sir Denzil Holles, 1st Baron Holles, Edward Hyde, 1st Earl of Clarendon, Colonel Sir John Hutchinson, Henry Ireton and the Bishops' Wars) and the fictionalisation of others (such as the suggestion that Cromwell orchestrated Rainsborough's death, of Rainsborough not Sexby being a close friend of Cromwell's, Sexby's going to Ireland and the losing of his arm and Sexby's assassination attempt on Cromwell).

Critical reception of the first episode was positive, with Nancy Banks-Smith of The Guardian praising Capaldi's performance and calling the drama  "rollicking", "well written and acted" and marked by "a quite serious attempt to explain the underlying issues". The Telegraph also praised Capaldi, along with the lack of anachronisms and the treatment of the era's sexual politics. The Independent called it "bodice-rippingly melodramatic" and showing a tension between Flannery's "desire to get as much real political fact in as he can and the ... requirement that a primetime series should liven up the party with sexual tension and historical glamour". The Times called it "a curious beast - mannered and theatrical, with modern-looking faces speaking period dialogue in an historical dreamscape" and "If not entirely successful, ... the best sort of failure - unusual, brave and fascinating". Another Times critic criticised it for "slightly too much reading history backwards here, almost making Angelica look like a modern woman travelled back in time" and its "frankly unnecessary bedroom scenes ... slipped in, presumably to demonstrate her liberated nature", whilst overall praising the episode as "gripping", "cutting" and "lively" and in particular noting that Simm played Sexby "strikingly". The Radio Times also noted it as "an intelligent, richly textured labour of love". John Adamson, a non-stipendiary by-fellow in History at Peterhouse, Cambridge, criticized the series as "a cartoon-strip version of the Civil War".

Awards and nominations
The series won in the Best Drama Series category at the 35th Broadcasting Press Guild Television and Radio Awards (2009) and Riseborough won in the Best Actress Category. Michele Clapton won at the BAFTA Awards, in the category of Best Costume Design.

References

External links
 
 
 Review, Leicester Mercury

2000s British television miniseries
Television series set in the 17th century
Channel 4 original programming
2008 British television series debuts
2008 British television series endings
2000s British drama television series
English Civil War films
Channel 4 television dramas
Television series by All3Media
English-language television shows
Cultural depictions of Charles I of England